Saidou Alioum Moubarak (born 25 July 2003) is a Cameroonian professional footballer who plays as a winger for Hammarby IF in Allsvenskan.

Early life
Alioum was born in Maroua, in the Far North Region of Cameroon, and started his career with local club Sahel FC in the domestic regional leagues.

Club career

Hammarby IF
On 22 July 2022, Alioum joined Hammarby TFF in Sweden's third tier Ettan, the feeder team of Allsvenskan club Hammarby IF, on a six-month loan. He made 11 league appearances for Hammarby TFF, scoring five goals, helping the side to finish 6th in the 2022 Ettan table.

On 30 January 2023, Alioum completed a permanent transfer to Hammarby, being part of their senior squad, signing a four-year contract. On 5 March the same year, he made his competitive debut for the club, coming on as a substitute in an 8–0 home win against GIF Sundsvall in Svenska Cupen. About a week later, he once again came on as a substitute in a 2–1 win against local rival AIK in the quarter-final of Svenska Cupen.

International career
In April 2019, Alioum was called up to Cameroon's squad for the Africa U-17 Cup of Nations. He made five appearances throughout the tournament, that Cameroon eventually went on to win.

In 2021, Alioum represented Cameroon in the Africa U-20 Cup of Nations. He made three appearances, before his country was knocked out by Ghana on penalties in the quarter finals.

Style of play

Alioum mainly operates as a winger.

Career statistics

Club

Notes

References

External links
 
 

2003 births
Living people
Association football midfielders
Cameroonian footballers
Cameroon youth international footballers
Ettan Fotboll players
Hammarby Fotboll players
Hammarby Talang FF players